Dionne Warwick in Valley of the Dolls is the title of Dionne Warwick's ninth album for the Scepter label.  It was recorded during the summer and fall of 1967 and was released early the next year on March 23, 1968.  It was recorded at A&R and Bell Sound Studios in New York City and was produced by Burt Bacharach and Hal David.

History
The album's lead single was the title track, "(Theme from) Valley of the Dolls", from the film of the same name. The song was written by André Previn and Dory Previn, and had initially been intended for Judy Garland before she was fired from the film. At the urging of one of the film's stars, Barbara Parkins, the song was given to Warwick. Warwick's Scepter version of the song, however, differed from the John Williams version included in the film. This was because Warwick was signed to Scepter, and the soundtrack was released on 20th Century Records.

Warwick was only permitted to appear on the film's actual soundtrack and not the soundtrack album recording. The Dionne Warwick single peaked at #2 on the Billboard Hot 100 for four weeks in February 1968, at #2 on the Cash Box and #1 on the Record World charts during the spring of 1968.  The LP was issued as number 568 in the Scepter Catalog. The cover art for this LP features Warwick on a black background, in an evening gown next to a director’s chair.

The LP would then yield Warwick's next big hit and first Grammy Award winner, "Do You Know the Way to San Jose".  The song, (which Warwick didn't initially like, according to Robin Platts in the book, Burt Bacharach & Hal David) would peak at #10 on the Billboard Hot 100 and become one of Warwick's signature songs. "Do You Know the Way to San Jose" also became one of Warwick's biggest international hits, selling over 3,500,000 copies.  Other notable songs on the LP were "Silent Voices" (which under its original Italian title, "La Voce Del Silenzio", had been Warwick's entry into the 1968 San Remo Song Festival), "Walking Backwards Down the Road", "Up, Up, and Away", and "You're My World" — another Italian song (written by Umberto Bindi, famous Genoa's songwriter) the latter having been a British #1 hit for Cilla Black, and "Let Me Be Lonely", the B side of the single "Do You Know the Way to San Jose", which charted on Billboard Hot 100 Singles Chart, becoming one of several double sided hits for Warwick during the 1960s. The album became an RIAA-certified gold record and peaked at #6 on the Billboard 200 album chart, #2 on the Billboard R&B Albums chart and #10 on the UK Albums Chart; the album would remain on the Billboard 200 for over a year and remains her highest-charting album on the chart. Rhino Records reissued the album on compact disc in 2004, combined with Windows of the World.

Track listing

Personnel 

Manny Albam – arranger, conductor
Burt Bacharach – arranger, conductor, producer
Hal David – arranger, producer
Peter Matz – arranger
Phil Ramone – engineer
Garry Sherman – arranger, conductor
Ed Smith – engineer
Dionne Warwick – vocals
Pat Williams – arranger

References

External links
Dionne Warwick in Valley of the Dolls at Discogs

1968 albums
Dionne Warwick albums
Albums produced by Burt Bacharach
Albums produced by Hal David
Scepter Records albums
Albums conducted by Manny Albam
Albums conducted by Burt Bacharach
Albums arranged by Manny Albam
Albums arranged by Burt Bacharach
Albums arranged by Hal David
Albums arranged by Peter Matz
Albums arranged by Patrick Williams (composer)